Terence Boylan (10 September 1910 – 10 January 1991) was an Irish Fianna Fáil politician and businessman. He was first elected to Dáil Éireann as a Fianna Fáil Teachta Dála (TD) for the Kildare constituency at the 1964 by-election caused by the death of William Norton of the Labour Party. He was re-elected at the 1965 and 1969 general elections but lost his seat at the 1973 general election.

References

1910 births
1991 deaths
Fianna Fáil TDs
Members of the 17th Dáil
Members of the 18th Dáil
Members of the 19th Dáil
Politicians from County Kildare